NIU College, Trade School was founded in 2005 in Lancaster, California, and in July 2012 it was moved to Los Angeles then the name was changed from TechExcel to NIU College, which is a trade school approved to offers 16 programs in the areas of Medical, Legal, HVAC & Automotive. NIU College offers a wide variety of programs at a fraction of the cost of other colleges.

History 

NIU College was founded in 1976 by Ted Dalton in Newport Beach, California. In 2002, the school was relocated to Wyoming under new management to operate under a permissive state higher education law, where it operated in accordance with the laws of the state of Wyoming and under the rules and regulations of the Wyoming Department of Education. In April 2009 a meeting of the NIU Board of Governors was held in the NIU Headquarters building in Laramie, Wyoming and decisions were made to move the facilities to Hayward, California. To accomplish this move, it was further decided that Newport International University would end its operations in Wyoming and would voluntarily return its license to the Wyoming Depart of Education. In October 2009, new legislation was passed requiring all private postsecondary schools, new or current, to be properly registered/renewed and approved by the state of California. Under new management in 2011, Newport International University began the process for approval by the Bureau for Private Postsecondary Education (BPPE). In 2014, Newport International University received BPPE approval to operate and educate in the state of California in the fields of business and psychology.

NIU was incorporated in Wyoming in 2002 and formerly operated there under a permissive state higher education law. After the state enacted a new law in 2006 requiring higher education institutions to be accredited or seek accreditation in order to remain in the state, NIU filed a lawsuit challenging the constitutionality of the new state law. The Wyoming Supreme Court upheld the law in a June 2008 ruling, and in April 2009 NIU relinquished its Wyoming registration and announced plans to merge with Newport University in California.

University maturation 
In 2003, Dr. Ted Dalton split Newport International University into two sectors. The first would become Newport University, the sector of the university designated for local students. The second would become Newport International University and the international sector of the university. The schools were split up and acquired as separate entities. All Newport International University logos, trademarks, licenses, publications, and website became the sole property of Newport International University.

University campus 
The campus is located at 6700 Fallbrook Avenue, West Hills, CA 91307, near one of the busiest intersections in the San Fernando Valley. The facility is close to shops and restaurants, has ample parking available and is located in a traffic-heavy thoroughfare. The campus is a short distance to the main highway (highways 101, 118, and 405) and public transportation is easily accessible. Aside from the U.S. campus, relationships have been created with schools in multiple countries, as facilitators, for Newport International University to use their campuses for students. All school campuses must meet the standards set by Newport International University and keep in line with the Bureau for Private Postsecondary Education's necessary requirements.

Student life 

While based in Wyoming, NIU operated educational programs in about 14 countries around the world.

Current programs 

NIU-College is offering three programs at the campus

1. Medical
- No-Cost Nurse Assistant Training
- Medical Assisting
- Clinical Medical Assistant
- Administrative Medical Assistant
- Phlebotomy Technician Program
- Nurse Assistant
- Medical Billing and Coding
- Home Health Aide

2. Legal
- Paralegal

3. HVAC
- Advanced HVAC Technology

New campus at Woodland Hills 

NIU College operates through a purpose build facility in Los Angeles
For Medical and Legal at 5959 Topanga Canyon Blvd. Suite 110, Woodland Hills, CA 91367
For HVAC at 8115 Canoga Ave. Unite, 4 Canoga Ave, Woodland Hills, CA 91304

Partnerships 
Newport International University has also created a partnership with English Language Center (ELC), a center for English as a second language, to help potential students. With this partnership, Newport International University students who wish to come to the U.S. are able to receive their I-20 (F-1 Visa) through ELC and take courses at the university alongside taking their English classes.

In addition to ELC, Newport International University has partnered with Net Language, an online center for English as a second language, to help students who wish to learn English online at the comfort of their home. Students can take both English and Spanish courses without ever leaving their neighborhood. Net Language provides these resources to people of all ages and group, including schools, governments, and corporations.

References

External links 
 Newport International University website

Unaccredited institutions of higher learning in the United States
For-profit universities and colleges in the United States